William Caldwell Plunkett (October 23, 1799 – January 19, 1884) was an American politician who served as the 20th Lieutenant Governor for the Commonwealth of Massachusetts from 1854 to 1855.  In 1853 he was a delegate to the state Constitutional Convention.  He lived in Adams for over 50 years and held many of the local offices.

He was born on October 23, 1799, in Lenox, Berkshire County, Massachusetts.  He died on January 19, 1884, in Adams, Berkshire County, Massachusetts.  His father was Patrick Plunkett; his mother was Mary Robinson.  He first married Achsah Brown; after her death he married her niece Louisa Brown.

Married 22 Apr 1839 in Elbridge, Onondaga County, New York by Rev J. B. Everett to Miss Louisa Brown daughter of Judge Timothy Brown of Elbridge, Onondaga County, New York.

See also
 1873 Massachusetts legislature

References

1799 births
1884 deaths
People from Adams, Massachusetts
Lieutenant Governors of Massachusetts
Massachusetts Whigs
19th-century American politicians